Liberty Avenue may refer to:

 Liberty Avenue (Pittsburgh), Pennsylvania, U.S.
 Liberty Avenue (New York City), New York, U.S.
 Liberty Avenue, Yerevan, Armenia
 Laisvės alėja, Kaunas, Lithuania
 Liberty Avenue station, a New York City Subway station